RTL2 is a private French radio station, based in Paris, created in 1992 and owned by the RTL Group. The station plays rock and pop music from the 1980s, 1990s, 2000s, 2010s and 2020s.

History

In January 1992, RTL2 was created after a fusion of the stations Maxximum and Radio Métropolys, and afterwards RTL 2 was created, then named M40. The station was owned by Prisa (48.5% of the capital) and the RTL Group (with 35.75%).

In January 1995, M40 changed its name to RTL1 and later that year, after a complaint from Europe 1, the station had to change its name again to finally become RTL2.

Identity of RTL2

Logos

Slogans
 1995–1996: 
 1996–1996: 
 1996–1998: 
 1998–2005: 
 Since 2005:

External links

References

Radio stations in France
Radio in Paris
Radio stations established in 1992